Maria (Bulgarian: Мария) was a Bulgarian royal consort as the wife of the Knyaz Boris I of Bulgaria. Her parents are unknown. She is mentioned in one charter from 850/96, together with her family members. 

These are the children of Boris and Maria:
Vladimir of Bulgaria
Gavriil (Gabriel)
Simeon I of Bulgaria
Jacob
Anna

Footnotes

External links 
Family of Boris I

Bulgarian consorts